Bruno Andreas Liljefors (14 May 1860 – 18 December 1939) was a Swedish artist. He is perhaps best known for his nature and animal motifs, especially with dramatic situations. He was the most important and probably most influential Swedish wildlife painter of the late nineteenth and early twentieth century. He also drew some sequential picture stories, making him one of the early Swedish comic creators.

Biography

 
Liljefors was born in Uppsala, Sweden.  His parents were Anders Liljefors and Maria Margareta Lindbäck. He was brother of the composer and conductor Ruben Liljefors (1871–1936). He went to Uppsala Cathedral School for six years. He received instruction from 1879–1882 at the Swedish Royal Academy of Fine Arts. From 1882-83, he made a study trip to Düsseldorf, Baiern, Venice, Florence, Naples, Rome  and Paris. He received inspiration from the Scandinavian artist colony in Grez-sur-Loing. In 1886, he became a member of the Artists' Union (Konstnärsförbundet), which was in opposition to the Royal Academy. From 1888–1889, he taught at Valand Academy in Gothenburg.

In 1887, he married Anna Olivia Olofsson (1864–1947). The marriage ended with a divorce in 1895 at which time  he married his first wife's younger sister Signe Adolfina Helena Olofsson (1871–1944). He was a resident of  Uppsala, until the summer of 1894 when he sought out the Stockholm archipelago. From 1905–1917, he lived at Ytterjärna in Södermanland and from 1917 to Österbybruk in Uppland. He established a studio in Österbybruk where he lived and worked between 1917 and 1932.

During the last years of the nineteenth century, a brooding element entered his work, perhaps the result of turmoil in his private life. He was often short of money and in 1925, he suffered a facial neuralgia with severe pain.  From 1932, Liljefors lived at Kungsholmen in Stockholm. The last two years of his life he spent in  Uppsala. Liljefors died in 1939 and was buried at the Uppsala old cemetery.

Work
Liljefors is held in high esteem by painters of wildlife and is acknowledged as an influence by, for example, American wildlife artist Michael Coleman. All his life Liljefors was a hunter, and he often painted predator-prey action, the hunts engaged between fox and hare, sea eagle and eider, and goshawk and black grouse serving as prime examples. However, he never exaggerated the ferocity of the predator or the pathos of the prey, and his pictures are devoid of sentimentality.

The darker quality in his paintings gradually began to attract interest, and he had paintings exhibited at the Paris Salon.
The influence of the Impressionists can be seen in his attention to the effects of environment and light, and later that of Art Nouveau in his Mallards, Evening of 1901, in which the pattern of the low sunlight on the water looks like leopardskin, hence the Swedish nickname Panterfällen. Bruno was fascinated by the patterns to be found in nature, and he often made art out of the camouflage patterns of animals and birds. He particularly loved painting capercaillies against woodland, and his most successful painting of this subject is the large-scale Capercaillie Lek, 1888, in which he captures the atmosphere of the forest at dawn. He was also influenced by Japanese art, for example in his Goldfinches, painted in the late 1880s.

Collections of his art are on display at the Nationalmuseum, Gothenburg Museum of Art, Thiel Gallery and Uppsala University. His work was also part of the painting event in the art competition at the 1932 Summer Olympics.

Style
He amassed a collection of animals to act as his living models. Ernst Malmberg recalled:

The greatness of Liljefors lay in his ability to show animals in their environment. Sometimes he achieved this through hunting and observation of the living animal, and sometimes he used dead animals; for example, his Hawk and Black Game, painted in the winter of 1883–84, was based on dead specimens, but he also used his memory of the flocks of black grouse in the meadows around a cottage he once lived in at Ehrentuna, near Uppsala. He wrote:

Assessment
Such practices have sometimes led to criticism of Liljefors' work; Lars Jonsson has noted a "heraldisation" of the drama in Golden Eagle Chasing a Hare, 1904, which causes a departure from pure naturalism, and he deduces from the position of the eagle's wing feathers that it would have been gliding rather than turning in reaction to the hare as painted.

Nevertheless, Liljefors was a pioneer at a time when wildlife art was still emerging from its association with scientific depiction and taxidermy. He also set a standard of identification with the landscape that substantially influenced the development of wildlife art in the twentieth century.

Paintings

References

Other sources
Allan Ellenius (1996) Bruno Liljefors: Naturen som livsrum (Bonnier Alba) 
Tor Harald Hedberg  (2010)  Bruno Liljefors  (Nabu Press) 
Martha Hill (1987) Bruno Liljefors the Peerless Eye (Doubleday)

External links
 
Cats by Liljefors

19th-century Swedish painters
Swedish male painters
20th-century Swedish painters
Animal artists
Swedish comics artists
1860 births
1939 deaths
Burials at Uppsala old cemetery
Olympic competitors in art competitions
19th-century Swedish male artists
20th-century Swedish male artists